The FIVB Volleyball World League was an annual international men's volleyball competition. Created in 1990, it was the longest and richest of all the international events organized by the Fédération Internationale de Volleyball (FIVB). The women's version of the competition was called FIVB Volleyball World Grand Prix. This event should not be confused with the other international volleyball competitions, the World Championship, the World Cup and the World Grand Champions Cup. 

From 2018, the World League and World Grand Prix was replaced by the men's and women's Nations League and men's and women's Challenger Cup.

History

Origins

The World League was created in 1990 as part of the intensive marketing programme that would become a distinctive mark of the FIVB's activities near the end of the century. The idea was to promote the sport of volleyball by establishing an annual competition that would appeal to audiences all over the world.

Winners
In the 1990s, the Italians dominated the World League, winning the first three tournaments in 1990, 1991 and 1992. Playing at home, Brazil, at the time the Olympic champions, managed to take the gold in 1993, but Italy regained the title in 1994 and 1995.

In 1996, foreshadowing what would happen just a couple of months later at the Atlanta Olympic Games, the Netherlands beat them in an extremely tight five-set match, before Italy once again won the gold in 1997. In 1998, the winners were Cuba, while in 1999 and 2000 Italy won again.

As can be seen, Italy were clearly the dominant team in the first decade of the World League: from 1990 to 2000, the World League was played 11 times, and Italy took gold eight times, while the remaining three titles were won by three different teams.

Italy's supremacy in the World League began to wane in 2001, when Brazil won a second gold medal, beating the Italians in three straight sets. With further titles each year from 2003 to 2007, and winning another titles in 2009 and 2010, the Brazilians were the preeminent at the start of the 21st century, being also World and Olympic Champions. The interruptions to Brazil's dominance came in 2002, when Russia took the title, and in 2008, with the United States winning gold and gaining positive momentum going into the Beijing Olympics.

Competition formula
The FIVB is constantly adapting the World League's competition formula to improve competitiveness and to make the games more attractive to the audience. Nevertheless, a few basic rules and restrictions will probably remain unchanged in the following years.

Teams who participate must provide local media coverage and live TV broadcasting.
The competition is divided in at least two phases: a preliminary round (usually called "Intercontinental Round"), with a system of rotating host cities; and one or more final rounds, with one or more host nations.
In the preliminary round, teams are organized in pools. Each team plays a total of four matches against all other teams in its pool, two at home, two as visitors. Each pair of matches is played over a weekend.
When all the matches of the preliminary round have been played, the top n teams in each pool qualify for the final round(s), and the remaining ones leave the competition. The value of n depends on the number of participating teams and the format that will be employed in the finals.
Host nation(s) automatically qualify for the final round(s).
The FIVB has tried various formats for the final round(s): Top Six, Top Four, Quarter-Semi-finals (Olympic format). For some years now (2004), the most commonly used is a mixed format: quarterfinalists are organized in two pools, and the top two teams in each pool play semifinals and finals according to the Olympic format.
In the preliminary round, a team is usually given the right to work with a list of nineteen players, from which the coach builds the fourteen-player line-up included two liberos (if the team include only one libero in the roster, their max roster number is limited to 12) that will be employed in a particular weekend. For the final round(s), only fourteen players included two liberos are allowed.

Hosts
List of hosts by number of final round championships hosted.

Appearance
Brazil and Italy are the only teams that participated in all editions of the World League.

Results summary

Medals summary

MVP by edition

1990 – 
1991 – 
1992 – 
1993 – 
1994 – 
1995 – 
1996 – 
1997 – 
1998 – 
1999 – 
2000 – 
2001 – 
2002 – 
2003 – 
2004 – 
2005 – 
2006 – 
2007 – 
2008 – 
2009 – 
2010 – 
2011 – 
2012 – 
2013 – 
2014 – 
2015 – 
2016 – 
2017 –

Gallery

See also

FIVB Volleyball Men's Nations League
FIVB Volleyball Men's World Championship
FIVB Volleyball Men's World Cup
FIVB Volleyball Women's Nations League
FIVB Volleyball World Grand Champions Cup
FIVB Volleyball World Grand Prix
List of indoor volleyball world medalists
Volleyball at the Summer Olympics

Notes

References

External links

Fédération Internationale de Volleyball – official website
FIVB Volleyball World League – official website
Results Archive – comprehensive results for all tournaments

 
Recurring sporting events established in 1990
Recurring sporting events disestablished in 2017
International men's volleyball competitions
Annual sporting events
Multi-national professional sports leagues